Piotr Kuncewicz (19 March 1936 – 9 April 2007) was a Polish writer and Freemason in the Grand Orient of Poland.

Works

 Samotni wobec historii, 1967
 Antyk zmęczonej Europy, 1982, 1988
 Grochowiak, 1976
 Cień ręki, 1977
 W poszukiwaniu codzienności, 1979
 Szumy, 1976
 Dęby kapitolińskie, 1970, 1973
 Zamieć, 1972
 Agonia i nadzieja: T. I. Literatura od 1919 (1993), T. II. Literatura od 1939 (1993), T. III. Poezja polska od 1956, część 1 i 2 (1994)
 Goj patrzy na Żyda, 2000. 
 Legenda Europy, 2005.

Polish male writers
Piotr
1936 births
2007 deaths